Hyde Newton is an electoral ward of Tameside, England. It is represented in Westminster by Jonathan Reynolds Labour Co-operative MP for Stalybridge and Hyde.

Councillors 
The ward is represented by three councillors: Philip Fitzpatrick (Lab), Helen Bowden (Lab Co-op), and Peter Robinson (Lab Co-op).

 indicates seat up for re-election.
 indicates seat won in by-election.

Elections in 2010s

May 2018

May 2016

May 2015

May 2014

May 2012

May 2011

May 2010

Elections in 2000s

By-election 5 February 2009

May 2008

May 2007

May 2006

June 2004

References 

Wards of Tameside